The men's marathon at the 2018 Commonwealth Games, as part of the athletics programme, was held in Southport Broadwater Parklands, Gold Coast on 15 April 2018.

Scotland's Callum Hawkins was the race leader with seven kilometres to go, and led the field by two minutes. At 28 degrees Celsius, the race conditions were unusually hot and Hawkins suffered exhaustion and collapsed on the road. He briefly tried to continue but again collapsed, hitting his head on the road side barrier. As race rules dictate that medics need athlete permission to intervene (and thus end the athlete's participation), he was left on the roadside for several minutes in view of spectators as he did not request assistance. The games organisers received criticism for not responding sooner to the athlete's distress, though the organisers stated that they had reacted in accordance to competition regulations. Hawkins was kept overnight at Gold Coast University Hospital for review. Paul Bush, chair of Commonwealth Games Scotland, asked for a formal review of the situation and to see if changes could be made in future races to prevent such outcomes.

Eight of the 25 entrants failed to finish the race.

Records
Prior to this competition, the existing world and Games records were as follows:

Schedule
The schedule was as follows:

All times are Australian Eastern Standard Time (UTC+10)

Results
The results were as follows:

References

Men's marathon
2018
2018 in men's athletics
Comm
2018 Commonwealth Games